Louis Gilbert "Lulu" Denis (June 7, 1928 – October 11, 2022) was a Canadian professional ice hockey forward who played three games in the National Hockey League for the Montreal Canadiens during the 1949–50 and 1950–51 seasons. The rest of his career, which lasted from 1948 to 1961, was spent with the Montreal Royals in the Quebec Senior Hockey League. Denis died on October 11, 2022, at the age of 94.

Career statistics

Regular season and playoffs

References

External links
 

1928 births
2022 deaths
Buffalo Bisons (AHL) players
Canadian ice hockey forwards
Ice hockey people from Saskatchewan
Montreal Canadiens players
Montreal Royals (EPHL) players
Montreal Royals (QSHL) players